Tonderai Kasu is a community leader in Chitungwiza, Zimbabwe. A medical doctor by training, he is the substantive Director of Health and Environmental Services for Chitungwiza, and has been the Acting Town Clerk or Acting Chief Executive, of the Chitungwiza Town Council.

Early life and education
Kasu was born in Harare. His family comes from Nyanga, Zimbabwe in Manicaland Province. He is from the Tangwena people, and he bears the same totem or mutupo, as the late Chief Rekayi Tangwena, that is Nhewa or Simboti (leopard). Kasu attended Peterhouse Boys' School near Marondera. He qualified as a medical doctor from the University of Zimbabwe. He holds a Master's degree in Public Sector Management from Africa University. He studied for a Doctor of Philosophy degree in public health at Africa University.

Career
Kasu was appointed to the position of Acting Town Clerk by a resolution of the full council of the Municipality of Chitungwiza at its ordinary meeting held on the 10th of December 2019, and served in this capacity until the 21st of August 2020. He is currently the substantive Director of Health and Environmental Services of the Municipality in Chitungwiza, and has served in this capacity since April 2016. He is also a member of the Environmental Management and Civil Protection Committees for the Harare Metropolitan Province. He is the former head of the accident and emergency department for St. Anne's Hospital. As a leader in the health sector, he has managed facilities that have won awards for high quality of clinical care. In the country's third largest urban center, he has led the response to two cholera outbreaks. He is currently leading Chitungwiza's response to the COVID-19 pandemic. As a senior public official having a background as a professional and as an administrator, and not as a politician, he has often encountered and experienced problems and setbacks in managing and meeting the expectations of the Chitungwiza community's multiple stakeholders, given the politically polarized environment in Chitungwiza. Although having been criticized as a harsh enforcer of government policies, particularly with respect to illegal and informal trading in Chitungwiza, he has been at the forefront of spearheading urban renewal and development in Chitungwiza. He has been active in sports development and in philanthropic work in the Chitungiwza community.

References 

Zimbabwean politicians
Africa University alumni
University of Zimbabwe alumni
Alumni of Peterhouse Boys' School
People from Manicaland Province
Year of birth missing (living people)
Living people
Zimbabwean people
Zimbabwean physicians
Zimbabwean academics
Zimbabwean scientists